Congenital insensitivity to pain with anhidrosis (CIPA) is a rare autosomal recessive disorder of the nervous system which prevents the feeling of pain or temperature, and prevents a person from sweating. Cognitive disorders are commonly coincident. CIPA is the fourth type of hereditary sensory and autonomic neuropathy (HSAN), and is also known as HSAN IV.

Signs and symptoms
Signs of CIPA are present from infancy. Infants may present with seizures related to an abnormally high body temperature. Since people with this condition are unable to sweat, they are unable to properly regulate their body temperature. Those affected are unable to feel pain and temperature.

The absence of pain experienced by people with CIPA puts them at high risk for accidental self-injury. Corneal ulceration occurs due to lack of protective impulses. Joint and bone problems are common due to repeated injuries, and wounds heal poorly.

Delayed developmental milestones in early years may be observed.
Patients often have severe learning difficulties, irritability, hyperactivity, and cognitive impairment, but patients with normal intelligence have also been reported.

Cause
CIPA is caused by a genetic mutation that prevents the formation of nerve cells which are responsible for transmitting signals of pain, heat, and cold to the brain.
The disorder is inherited in an autosomal recessive fashion.

CIPA is caused by a mutation in NTRK1, a gene encoding the neurotrophic tyrosine kinase receptor. NTRK1 is a receptor for nerve growth factor (NGF). This protein induces outgrowth of axons and dendrites and promotes the survival of embryonic sensory and sympathetic neurons. The mutation in NTRK1 does not allow NGF to bind properly, causing defects in the development and function of nociceptive reception.

Mitochondrial abnormalities in muscle cells have been found in people with CIPA. Skin biopsies show a lack of innervation of the eccrine glands and nerve biopsies show a lack of small myelinated and unmyelinated fibers.

Diagnosis
Diagnosis is made based on clinical criteria and can be confirmed with genetic testing.

Differential diagnosis 
The absence of or significantly reduced sweating in CIPA patients can be used for a differential diagnosis.

Treatment 
There is no treatment for CIPA. Attention to injuries to prevent infection and worsening is necessary.

Epidemiology 
Worldwide several hundred cases have been reported, but the exact prevalence is unknown.

The condition is inherited and is most common among Negev Arabs aka Negev Bedouins. 
For Japan, the prevalence is estimated at 1/600,000-950,000.

Approximately 20% of people with CIPA die of hyperthermia by age 3.

Anaesthetic Management 
Some patients have been operated without anesthesia, but anxiety might still need to be alleviated. 

Patients might have tactical hyperesthesia, in which case anesthesia necessary.

Bradycardia, hypotension, and hyperthermia also require management/attention, before, during and after surgery.

References

Further reading
 

Autosomal recessive disorders
Neurocutaneous conditions
Peripheral nervous system disorders
Rare diseases